

Seeds

  Ivan Ljubičić (qualifying competition, lucky loser)
  Max Mirnyi (qualifying competition, lucky loser)
  Ronald Agénor (second round)
  Roger Federer (second round)
  Antony Dupuis (first round)
  Davide Sanguinetti (first round)
  Laurence Tieleman (qualifying competition, lucky loser)
  Oliver Gross (first round)
  Xavier Malisse (qualified)
  Peter Wessels (qualified)
  Michael Kohlmann (qualified)
  Adrian Voinea (second round)
  Lorenzo Manta (qualified)
  Nicolas Escudé (qualified)
  Axel Pretsch (qualified)
  Ville Liukko (qualified)
  Juan Ignacio Chela (first round)
  Mikael Tillström (qualifying competition, lucky loser)
  Oleg Ogorodov (first round)
  Gastón Etlis (qualifying competition)
  Nicolás Massú (first round)
  Vladimir Voltchkov (first round)
  Christophe Rochus (second round)
  Vincenzo Santopadre (qualifying competition)
  Lars Burgsmüller (qualified)
  Julien Boutter (qualified)
  Alexander Popp (first round)
  Mosé Navarra (first round)
  Fredrik Jonsson (qualified)
  Tuomas Ketola (qualifying competition)
  Christian Vinck (second round)
  Stéphane Huet (qualified)

Qualifiers

  Cyril Saulnier
  Stéphane Huet
  Fredrik Jonsson
  Ivo Heuberger
  Takao Suzuki
  Cristiano Caratti
  Julien Boutter
  Lars Burgsmüller
  Xavier Malisse
  Peter Wessels
  Michael Kohlmann
  George Bastl
  Lorenzo Manta
  Nicolas Escudé
  Axel Pretsch
  Ville Liukko

Lucky losers

  Ivan Ljubičić
  Max Mirnyi
  Laurence Tieleman
  Mikael Tillström

Qualifying draw

First qualifier

Second qualifier

Third qualifier

Fourth qualifier

Fifth qualifier

Sixth qualifier

Seventh qualifier

Eighth qualifier

Ninth qualifier

Tenth qualifier

Eleventh qualifier

Twelfth qualifier

Thirteenth qualifier

Fourteenth qualifier

Fifteenth qualifier

Sixteenth qualifier

References
1999 US Open – Men's draws and results at the International Tennis Federation

Men's Singles Qualifying
US Open (tennis) by year – Qualifying